Gregor Buchanan (born 31 March 1990) is a Scottish footballer who plays as a defender for Scottish League Two club Dumbarton where he is the club's vice-captain. 

After progressing through Falkirk's youth academy, Buchanan played for Scottish Junior clubs Armadale Thistle and Bathgate Thistle. Buchanan later played for Airdrieonians, Dunfermline Athletic, Dumbarton (first spell), St Mirren, Livingston, Greenock Morton, Falkirk and Queen of the South

Early and personal life
Buchanan is originally from Falkirk in Stirlingshire.

Career
Buchanan was released by Falkirk at the age of sixteen. Buchanan then played with Scottish Junior clubs Armadale Thistle and Bathgate Thistle, before signing for Scottish First Division club Airdrie United in July 2012. In his first season with The Diamonds, Buchanan was part of the team that finished bottom of the final Scottish First Division. In the 2013–14 season, Buchanan helped the club to a mid-table finish and after some impressive performances was signed by fellow Scottish League One club Dunfermline Athletic.

A few weeks after leaving the Pars, Buchanan signed for Dumbarton and was Stephen Aitken's first signing for the club in May 2015. Buchanan renewed his contract at the end of the 2015-16 season.

Buchanan departed the Sons after 77 appearances, scoring three goals and then signed for Scottish Championship rivals St Mirren on a one-year deal in May 2017. Prior to turning professional with St Mirren, as a part-time player, Buchanan worked as an insurance salesman. After limited chances to play for the Buddies, Buchanan departed the club by mutual consent on 11 January 2018 and signed for Livingston.  Both of the clubs Buchanan represented in the 2017-18 season, the Buddies and the Lions, were promoted from the Scottish Championship. Buchanan was awarded a Championship winner's medal for his time at the Buddies.

Buchanan signed a one-year deal with Greenock Morton in June 2018. In June 2019, Buchanan signed for home-town club Falkirk. Buchanan departed the Bairns at the end of the 2019-20 season, after being appointed club captain that season.

On 24 August 2020, Buchanan signed for Queen of the South until 31 May 2021.

On 12 February 2021, Buchanan captained Queens in his 300th club career match versus Hearts as the match ended in a 1-1 draw at Palmerston Park.

On 12 June 2021, after leaving the Doonhamers, Buchanan returned to Dumbarton, signing a two-year deal. He was named the club's vice-captain in June 2022.

Career statistics

Honours
St Mirren
SPFL Championship 2017–18

References

External links

1990 births
Airdrieonians F.C. players
Armadale Thistle F.C. players
Association football defenders
Bathgate Thistle F.C. players
Dumbarton F.C. players
Dunfermline Athletic F.C. players
Falkirk F.C. players
Greenock Morton F.C. players
Living people
Livingston F.C. players
Scottish Football League players
Scottish footballers
Scottish Professional Football League players
St Mirren F.C. players
Queen of the South F.C. players